Scott Cutler (born 1969) is an American technology executive and is currently CEO of StockX. Formerly the executive vice president and head of global listings at the New York Stock Exchange, he has been an executive at eBay since April 2015. In August 2017, Cutler was promoted to Senior Vice President, Americas, at eBay following his stint as President of StubHub, an eBay subsidiary.

Early life and career
Cutler attended Brigham Young University in Provo, Utah, where he earned his bachelor's degree in economics.  He went on to attend Hastings College of Law at the University of California to receive his JD. Cutler is still involved in BYU, where he has served on the National Advisory Council since 2014.

In 1997, Cutler was appointed to Associate and corporate securities lawyer at Cooley Godward Kronish LLP in Palo Alto, California, where he worked for two years. Cutler subsequently moved to Thomas Weisel Partners, an investment banking firm in San Francisco, where he served as vice president from 1999 to 2005. He then transitioned into Head of West Coast Software at Cowen and Company LLC, a position he held until 2006.

Recent career
In 2006, Cutler joined the NYSE as head of listings by then-CEO John Thain. He was instrumental in making a change in NYSE's listing requirements, which in 2008 resulted in a "lowered threshold for the size of listed companies to $150 million from $250 million, and the removal of a requirement that a company had to be profitable for three straight years". According to Cutler, the changes saw a 40% increase in companies who could quality for a NYSE listing, going from 30 to 70 percent. Other major initiatives undertaken by Cutler included establishing relationships in the technology sector and organizing boot camps for executives of companies considering going public. As a result of Cutler, NYSE increased its share of Internet and technology listings, and according to Bloomberg, in 2013 they "won more debuts in the sector than NASDAQ for the first time".

After an eight-year term with NYSE, Cutler stepped down from his position in March 2015. The following month, Cutler was appointed the President of eBay subsidiary StubHub, replacing Chris Tsakalakis. While at StubHub, Cutler oversaw the business's transition to a mobile-first platform and enacted changes that increased ticket sales by 33% in his first six months.

Cutler was promoted to Senior Vice President, Americas at eBay in August 2017, and continued also leading StubHub until May 2018, when he was succeeded by Sukhinder Singh Cassidy.

Cutler is active on a number of boards and organizations. He served as a board member of the American Society/Council of the Americas from 2012 to 2014 and has been on the board of the British American Business Council since 2010. He has been Vice Chairman of the Mental Health Association of NYC
since 2010 and a member of the Young Presidents' Organization since 2011. He is also on the board of the Madison Square Boys & Girls Club in New York City.

Personal life
Outside work, Cutler enjoys athletics, completing marathons in Seattle, Sacramento, St. George, Napa, and New York City and in 9 stages of the Tour de France. He also enjoys Alpine mountaineering, having climbed numerous peaks in North Cascades and the Sierra Nevada, ski-touring across the Swiss Alps, and fly-fishing. Cutler and his wife have four children.

References

1969 births
Living people
American business executives
StubHub employees
EBay employees
Brigham Young University alumni
University of California, Hastings College of the Law alumni
20th-century American lawyers
20th-century American businesspeople
21st-century American businesspeople